HD 73534 b is an extrasolar planet which orbits the G-type subgiant star HD 73534, located approximately 272 light years away in the constellation Cancer. It is at least 15% more massive than Jupiter and orbits at an average distance of 3.15 AU and takes 4.9 years to complete the orbit in a nearly circular path with an eccentricity similar to Jupiter. This planet was detected by radial velocity method on August 12, 2009.

The planet HD 73534 b is named Drukyul. The name was selected by Bhutan as part of the NameExoWorlds campaigns during the 100th anniversary of the IAU. Drukyul means "land of the thunder dragon", the native name of Bhutan.

See also
 Appearance of extrasolar planets
 Cancer (Chinese astronomy)
 Lists of exoplanets
 Gliese 1132 b, Rocky exoplanet with a confirmed atmosphere.
 Mu Arae c, At constellation Ara
 Planetary system

References

Exoplanets discovered in 2008
Giant planets
Cancer (constellation)
Exoplanets detected by radial velocity
Giant planets in the habitable zone
Exoplanets with proper names